Mahipativarman (Khmer: ព្រះអង្គម្ចាស់ មហិទ្ធិវរ្ម័ន, Thai: มหิปติวรมัน) was the son of King Rajendravarman I. The last king of the Lower Chenla kingdom, he was beheaded by King Sanjaya in 802 CE.

References

Chenla
Khmer Empire
7th-century Cambodian monarchs